The  Pylaia depot is an under-construction railway depot serving Thessaloniki Metro's Line 1 and Line 2. It will feature  of space and is expected to enter service in 2023.

References

See also
List of Thessaloniki Metro stations

Thessaloniki Metro